Robert Frederick Bruce (29 January 1906 – 6 April 1978) was a Scottish footballer.

Born in Paisley, Bruce was an inside left who developed with the Glaswegian junior side St. Anthony's. He spent his senior career with Aberdeen (1924–1928), Middlesbrough F.C. (1928–1935), Sheffield Wednesday F.C. (1935–1936), and Ipswich Town F.C. (1936–1938). His last club was Mossley A.F.C., where he held the role of player-manager during the 1938–39 season. He played once for the Scottish national team, against Austria in 1933.

Honours
Sheffield Wednesday
 FA Charity Shield: 1935

References

External links
Profile of Bruce

1906 births
1978 deaths
Scotland international footballers
Aberdeen F.C. players
Middlesbrough F.C. players
Sheffield Wednesday F.C. players
Ipswich Town F.C. players
Mossley A.F.C. players
Mossley A.F.C. managers
St Anthony's F.C. players
Scottish Junior Football Association players
Scotland junior international footballers
Association football inside forwards
Scottish footballers
Footballers from Paisley, Renfrewshire
Scottish football managers